Arturo Artemio Ferreyros Pérez (12 October 1924 – 2007) was a Peruvian basketball player. He competed in the men's tournament at the 1948 Summer Olympics.

References

External links
 

1924 births
2007 deaths
Peruvian men's basketball players
1954 FIBA World Championship players
Olympic basketball players of Peru
Basketball players at the 1948 Summer Olympics
Sportspeople from Lima
Date of death missing
Place of death missing
20th-century Peruvian people